Queens High School for the Sciences at York College (commonly called QHSSYC or QHSS) is a New York City public specialized high school operated by the New York City Department of Education specializing in mathematics and science. It admits students based only on their scores on the Specialized High Schools Admissions Test (commonly referred to as the SHSAT). The school was founded in 2002 along with the High School for Math, Science and Engineering at City College and the High School of American Studies at Lehman College. QHSSYC is a member of the National Consortium for Specialized Secondary Schools of Mathematics, Science and Technology (NCSSSMST).

In 2012, the U.S. News & World Report ranked QHSSYC as the 52nd best "Gold Medal" high school in the United States, and the 8th best "Gold Medal" high school in New York. In 2015, Queens High School for the Sciences at York College was named 3rd in the state and 25th overall in the country for best high schools statewide and nationally. The school is operated by the New York City Department of Education. In 2010, according to the Department of Education annual school reports, QHSSYC had one of the highest graduation rates, test scores, and attendance statistics in New York City, and was assigned the highest possible grade of 'A'.

Academics 
The school collaborates with York College in an agreement that allows the high school students to use college facilities such as the library, cafeteria, and gymnasium.  It is housed on the second floor of the college's science building.

Queens High School for the Sciences places an emphasis on the sciences and mathematics as part of its college-preparatory curriculum. The curriculum is centered about the Regents and Advanced Placement exams; the school generates some of the highest test scores in the country. As a New York City Department of Education high school, QHSSYC requires 44 credits to graduate with a New York State Regents diploma. Requirements for the Advanced Regents Diploma are set by New York State.

Some students participate in mentorships and internships to develop research projects presented in various fairs and symposiums throughout the US, including the International Science and Engineering Fair.

Extracurriculars 
The school features a wide variety of extracurriculars, including many clubs and a few sports teams. These clubs may vary from year-to-year as many of them are extremely new. These clubs include QHSS Alchemists, QHSS Music Makers, Key Club, Model UN, Robotics Club, Asian American Association, Veritas Literary Magazine, Amnesty International, Esports Club, Gender Sexuality Alliance, No Place For Hate, Chess Club, Muslim Student Association, CardinalFOSS, American Red Cross, Green Team and QHSS Bookworms.

QHSSYC also has a bowling and swimming team fielded by the Public School Athletic League.

History 

In June 2006, founding principal Brian Jetter retired, and Jie Zhang took his place. In June 2011, Principal Jie Zhang was transferred to Stuyvesant High School, and Dr. David Marmor took her place. Dr. Marmor left after the 2012–13 school year and the position was then held by Lenneen Gibson as Principal until October 2016, where she was then temporarily replaced by B.D. Anthony. The principal is now Ana De Jesus, who became principal in November 2016.

March 2022 bomb scare 
On Monday, March 7, 2022, an anonymous caller sent a bomb threat to York College, which the high school's campus resides on. Students were evacuated around 11am to a local high school.

Transportation 
The New York City Subway's Sutphin Boulevard – Archer Avenue (E, J, Z) station is located nearby, as well as New York City Bus's  routes. Students residing a certain distance from the school are provided full-fare student MetroCards for public transportation on their first day of school.

References

External links 
 
 2003-2004 Annual School Report Card

Public high schools in Queens, New York
Specialized high schools in New York City
Educational institutions established in 2002
University-affiliated schools in the United States
Jamaica, Queens
2002 establishments in New York City
York College, City University of New York